Yannick Hasler (born 6 May 1998) is a Swiss former footballer who played in the 1990s as defender. He studied Economics (lic. rer. pol. University of Basel) and works for Bâloise since 2002.

Football career

Hasler played his youth football for FC Basel and advanced to the first team for their 1995–96 season under head-coach Claude Andrey. After playing in four test games Hasler played his domestic league debut for the club in the home game in the St. Jakob Stadium on 18 April 1996 as Basel played 0–2 against Grasshopper Club.

Hasler then played the 1998–99 season with FC Baden in the second tier of Swiss football and the first half of the 1999–2000 season with SV Muttenz in the third tier. He then returned to Basel but played either in the eldest youth team or with their reserve team

Between the years 1995 and 200 Hasler played a total of 14 games for the Basel first team. Five of these games were in the Nationalliga A, one in the UEFA Intertoto Cup and seven were friendly games.

Private life
Yannick Hasler studied Economics and obtained his Licentiate (lic. rer. pol.) at the University of Basel. During his studies he played football at the top level. He joined Bâloise in 2002, where one of his roles included managing the Motor Vehicle Insurance Department, which he did for eight years. He held the role of Head of Pricing at Baloise from 2015 and in 2019 he was selected as a new member of the Executive Committee at Baloise Switzerland for the Product Management Private Customers Department as of 1 January 2020.

References

Sources
 Rotblau: Jahrbuch Saison 2017/2018. Publisher: FC Basel Marketing AG. 
 Die ersten 125 Jahre. Publisher: Josef Zindel im Friedrich Reinhardt Verlag, Basel. 
 Verein "Basler Fussballarchiv" Homepage

FC Basel players
SV Muttenz players
FC Baden players
Swiss men's footballers
Association football defenders
Swiss Super League players
1978 births
Living people